Umar Zahir (30 May 1971) is a Maldivian singer.

Career
Born in GA. Dhaandhoo, Adam initiated his career as a musician by joining a local band to take part in some of the occasional stage shows held in his island and atoll. He rose to prominence in the year 1999, where he released the studio albums Husreethi and Nadhuru which all went to become a huge success. This led to Mukhthar receiving several offers from music directors and his voice was heard in several albums released during the year 2000 to 2006.

In 2002, the Government of Maldives honoured him with the National Award of Recognition. In 2008, Mukhthar released his album Fini Roalhi which was considered a moderate success. However, with the fading demand for studio albums, he slowly become detached from the music releases. After his appearance in Ehan'dhaanugai Retro (2011) with the song "Than Dheyshiey Mithuraaey" alongside Mariyam Shaliya, he disappeared from the musical scene and was more involved in politics. "E Hoadhi Ufaathakaa" from the album Arutha (1998), "Loabin Hoadhan Erey" from Dhanmaanu (1998), "Goalhi Goalhi Kanmathin" from Soora (2000) and "Hinithun Velaashey Kalaa" from the series of the same name (2006) and remain as some of his most popular releases in his career.

Despite stepping away from the musical scene for personal reasons, many of his songs remain popular even after several years of its release. In 2018, Mukhthar was ranked at sixth in the list of the "Most Desired Comeback Voices", compiled by Dho?. In 2020, he was ranked at the tenth position in the list of "Most Listened Vocalist of 2020" compiled by the music streaming platform, Lavafoshi, marking him as the third playback singer to be featured in the list after Ali Rameez and Umar Zahir.

Discography

Feature film

Short film

Television

Non-film songs

Religious / Madhaha

Controversy
On 16 February 2020, Maldives Police Service issued a search hunt for him over a case lodged at Civil Court, following his failure to attend a hearing on a case of proven debt.

Accolades

References 

Living people
People from Malé
1971 births
Maldivian playback singers